The WWE Raw Tag Team Championship is a professional wrestling world tag team championship contested in WWE on the Raw brand. Introduced as the WWE Tag Team Championship, it was WWE's third world tag team title, and sixth tag team title overall. After WWE bought the promotions of Extreme Championship Wrestling (ECW) and World Championship Wrestling (WCW), and unified the WCW Tag Team Championship into its own title at Survivor Series 2001, it split its roster into two brands, Raw and SmackDown. As WWE's original World Tag Team Championship was designated exclusive to the Raw brand, SmackDown introduced the WWE Tag Team Championship as its own championship.

In 2007, after the initiation of the ECW brand, the title was shared between the SmackDown and ECW brands, thus inter-brand matches could take place for the title. In 2009, the title was unified with the World Tag Team Championship by The Colóns (Carlito and Primo) at WrestleMania XXV and became recognized as the "Unified WWE Tag Team Championship" until August 2010 when the World Tag Team Championship was decommissioned in favor of continuing the lineage of the WWE Tag Team Championship. In 2016, WWE reintroduced its brand split and the championship became exclusive to Raw. It was subsequently renamed to Raw Tag Team Championship after SmackDown introduced its SmackDown Tag Team Championship.

The championship is generally contested in professional wrestling matches, in which participants execute scripted finishes rather than contend in direct competition. The inaugural champions were Kurt Angle and Chris Benoit, who won the title in a tournament final at No Mercy on October 20, 2002. The Usos (Jey Uso and Jimmy Uso) are the current champions in their third reign. They defeated previous champions RK-Bro (Randy Orton and Riddle) in a Winners Take All match on the May 20, 2022 episode of SmackDown in Grand Rapids, Michigan. The Usos had also defended the SmackDown Tag Team Championship in the match, and with both titles, they are recognized as the Undisputed WWE Tag Team Champions.

The team of Cesaro and Sheamus and The New Day (Kofi Kingston and Xavier Woods) have the most reigns as a team at four, while individually, Kingston and Seth Rollins have the most with six. The New Day's second reign is also the longest reign at 483 days and they are the only team to hold the championship for over one consecutive year—Big E is also credited for this reign as during New Day's first two reigns, Big E, Kingston, and Woods were all recognized as champion under the Freebird Rule (Big E was split from the team in the 2020 WWE Draft). John Cena and The Miz's sole reign as a team is the shortest reign at 9 minutes, due to The Corre invoking their rematch clause immediately after losing the title. As a team, The New Day (across its two different variants of team members) also have the longest combined reign at 627 days, while Kingston individually has the longest combined reign at 912 days (910 days as recognized by WWE). Nicholas is the youngest champion at 10 years old (also making him the youngest champion in WWE history), while Billy Gunn is the oldest champion at age 50.

Title history

Names

Reigns

Combined reigns 

By team

By wrestler

Notes

See also 
 List of World Tag Team Champions (WWE)
 Tag team championships in WWE

References

General

Specific

External links 
 Official WWE Raw Tag Team Championship Title History
 WWE Raw Tag Team Championship history at Wrestling-Titles.com

WWE tag team champion lists